The Søren Gyldendal Prize (Danish: Søren Gyldendal-Prisen) is a Danish literary award, which was established in 1958 by Gyldendal Publishing House. The prize is awarded annually on 12 April, the anniversary of the birthday of Søren Gyldendal (1742-1802) founder of Gyldendal Publishing House. In 1958 the prize was DKK 10,000. In the period 1991 to 2000 it was increased to DKK 100,000. From 2001 to 2008 it was DKK 150,000. Since 2009 it has been DKK 200,000.

Recipients of the prize

References

External links 
 Litteraturpriser.dk about the Søren Gyldendal Prize

Danish literary awards